The president of the Federal Senate, sometimes referred to as the President of the Senate, is the presiding officer of the Federal Senate of Brazil.

In addition to chairing the chamber's debates and ordering its business, the president of the Federal Senate stands third in the order of presidential succession, after the vice-president of the republic and the president of the Chamber of Deputies, but before the president (chief justice) of the Supreme Federal Court. The Federal Senate president is also a member of the Council of the Republic, and presides over joint sessions of the Legislative branch, in his capacity as ex officio president of the National Congress. Until 25 August 1961, this position was held ex officio by the vice-president of the republic.

The current president of the Federal Senate is Rodrigo Pacheco of the Social Democratic Party, elected on 1 February 2021.

List of presidents of the Senate

Empire of Brazil (1826–1889)

Brazilian Republic (1889 - today)

See also
President of the Chamber of Deputies of Brazil

References

External links
Senado Federal: Mesa Directora

Brazil, Senate